The Nawab of Mamdot was the title of the hereditary rulers of Mamdot, a princely state, near Firozpur, in the Punjab region of British India.

Background
In 1794, Nizamuddin and his younger brother Qutbuddin, established themselves as rulers of Kasur. Following the death of his elder brother, Qutbuddin began to openly challenge the authority of Maharajah Ranjit Singh and in February 1807, the Maharajah marched on Kasur and removed Qutbuddin from power. As a gesture of goodwill the Maharajh granted Qutbuddin the jagir of Mamdot,  territory which he had recently acquired from the Rai of Raikot. In 1831, Qutbuddin was ousted as jagir by his nephew Fatehuddin and shortly after died in Amritsar. The Maharajah in turn replaced Fatehuddin with Jamaluddin, the eldest son of Qutubudin.

In 1845, the East India Company offered to confirm Jamaluddin's status in return for support during the forthcoming Sutlej Campaign. Jamaluddin opposed the British at the battles of Mudki and Ferozeshah and in the latter his brother Fatehuddin was killed. Towards the end of the campaign, sensing a British victory, he offered them support at Ferozepur when under attack by the Khalsa Army. For this assistance, in 1848 he was allowed to retain his possessions and awarded the title Nawab. However later accusations of abuse of power and oppression led to an investigation against him, and he was stripped of his powers in 1855. The state of Mamdot subsequently became part of Firozpur district and the title went into abeyance. On the death of Jamaluddin in 1863, the succession of Mamdot was disputed between the sons of Jamaluddin and his younger brother Jalaluddin. 

On 5 October 1864, the Governor-General of India under the authority of the British Crown conferred the hereditary title of Nawab of Mamdot on Jalaluddin. Although he had opposed the British during the Sutlej Campaign, he was deemed untainted by his brother's misgovernance, and rewarded for faithful service during the Second Anglo-Sikh War and the Indian Rebellion of 1857. In 1870, Jamaluddin was made an Honoury Magistrate, and he died in 1875. His titles and possessions passed to his eldest son Nizamuddin.

Nawabs of Mamdot (1848)
Nawab Jamaluddin Khan (died 1863)

Nawabs of Mamdot (1864)
 Nawab Jalaluddin Khan (died 1875) 
 Nawab Nizamuddin Khan (1862-1891), eldest son of the first Nawab
 Nawab Ghulam Qutbuddin Khan (1889-1928), eldest son of the second Nawab
 Nawab Sir Shahnawaz Khan (1883-1942), great nephew of the first Nawab
 Nawab Iftikhar Hussain Khan (1906-1969) (eldest son of the fourth Nawab), Nawab Aslam Khan Mamdot (middle son of the fourth Nawab), Nawab Zulfiqar Khan Mamdot (youngest son of the fourth Nawab)
 Nawab Pervaiz Iftikhar Mamdot (eldest son of Nawab Iftikhar), Nawab Suhail Khan Mamdot (elder son of Nawab Aslam), Nawab Naveed Aslam Khan Mamdot (younger son of Nawab Aslam), Abdul Qadir Mamdot (son of Nawab Zulfiqar)
 Nawab Shahnawaz Mamdot, eldest son of the sixth Nawab

Present day
Following the Partition of India, Mamdot became part of newly created Republic of India. The Nawab at the time of partition, Iftikhar Hussain Khan, went on to become the first Chief Minister of West Punjab in Pakistan. Within India, the hereditary title of "Nawab of Mamdot" was officially, constitutionally and  legally abolished in 1971 under the twenty-sixth Amendment of the Constitution of India.

References

People from British India
History of Punjab
Mamdot family
Nawabs of India